Gunship is a British synthwave band formed in 2014 by Dan Haigh and Alex Westaway; they were later joined by drummer Alex Gingell.

History 
After Westaway and Haigh's other musical act, Fightstar, went on hiatus in 2010, the pair decided to focus on other musical ventures, including forming Gunship, eventually joined by Gingell. Their debut release, self-titled Gunship, was released in 2015 to positive reviews. Their follow up, Dark All Day, was released 5 October 2018.

In 2019, Gunship appeared in the documentary film The Rise of the Synths, which explored the origins and growth of the Synthwave genre. Westaway, Haigh and Gingell appeared alongside various other composers from the scene, including John Carpenter, who also starred in and narrated the film.

In May of 2021, tattoo artist and model Kat Von D collaborated with Haigh on her debut album, Love Made Me Do It.

Equipment and gear 
Gunship has a large collection of synthesizers, including the Juno 106, DSI Prophet 12, DSI Prophet 6, MOOG Minimoog, MOOG Mother 32, and various Oberheim units.

Collaborators

Gunship 
The first Gunship album featured collaborations with:
 Lou Hayter (New Young Pony Club, Tomorrows World)
 John Carpenter (director/composer)
 Charlie Simpson (Fightstar, Busted)
 Martin Grech
 Stella Le Page was featured on 'Fly For Your Life'

Dark All Day 
The second Gunship album featured collaborations with:

 Tim Cappello (The Lost Boys)
 Richard K. Morgan (Author - Altered Carbon)
 Kat Von D
 Wil Wheaton
 Indiana
 Stella Le Page was featured on 'Art3mis & Parzival'
 Una Healy

The Video Game Champion (single) 
The single featured a collaboration with the guitarist Thomas McRocklin.

Ghost (Single) 
This single was a collaboration with Melbourne Synthwave duo Power Glove

Members
 Alex Westaway – vocals, multi-instruments
 Dan Haigh – multi-instruments
 Alex Gingell – multi-instruments

Discography 
Studio albums

Collaborations and other releases
 Collaborated with Metrik on the track "Electric Echo" (2016)
 Remixed a track for Lionface's No Hope State (2017)
 Collaborated with Lazerhawk on the track "Feel the Rush Tonight" (2017)
 Included the track "Vale of Shadows" on the album Rise of the Synths EP2 official companion album. (2017)
 Released the single "Art3mis & Parzival" (2018)
 Collaborated with Tim Cappello and Indiana for the single "Dark All Day" (2018), which features on their album of the same name.
 Included the track "Cthulhu" on the album Fangoria Presents: Hollydoom (Original Magazine Soundtrack) (2019)
Collaborated with Tyler Bates and Dave Lombardo for "Berserker" on the Dark Nights: Death Metal Soundtrack

Remixes 
The following artists have remixed Gunship songs:
 Carpenter Brut (Tech Noir)
 Makeup and Vanity Set (Black Sun on the Horizon)
 Miami Nights 1984 (Revel In Your Time)
Power Glove (Dark All Day)

References 

Synthwave groups
2014 establishments in the United Kingdom
British electronic music groups